Udarata Menike (Hill Country Maiden) is a daytime passenger train that runs between Colombo and Badulla in Sri Lanka.

The Udarata Menike made its maiden journey on 23 April 1956.  The Badulla-bound train departs from Colombo at 8.30 a.m., while the Colombo-bound train leaves Badulla at 5.45
a.m. The trip takes about 10 hours.

Services
The train offers three classes: 1st, 2nd and 3rd, The latter sometimes gets very crowded and carries only basic facilities. The train also includes a buffet car.

The observation saloon has been removed since the introduction of Class S12 DMUs.

Route
The Udarata Menike travels the length of Sri Lanka Railways' Main Line through the hill country.

The Udarata Menike begins its eastbound service at Colombo Fort Station and runs east and north past the centers of Ragama, Gampaha, Veyangoda, and Polgahawela. At Rambukkana, the Main Line begins its steep climb into the hills of the upcountry. Between Balana and Kadugannawa, the track clings to the side of sheer cliffs, providing views of Batalegala ('Bible' Rock). The train then continues its climb through the scenic tea country, connecting local market centers at Gampola, Nawalapitiya, and Hatton before reaching Nanu-Oya. This is the connection to the former colonial resort of Nuwara Eliya, still visited for its temperate climate, classic hotels, and British-style gardens. In the upcountry, passengers can view the tea gardens, mountains, valleys, and waterfalls.

Rolling stock
The service was run by M6 locomotives pulling Romanian-built ASTRA passenger coaches. This service is now carried out by Class S14 DMUs.

See also
 Sri Lanka Railways
 List of named passenger trains of Sri Lanka

References

External links
Great Railway Journeys of the World: Colombo to Badulla on the Udarata Menike Express (or: Why do you need to buy a newspaper before travelling on this train?), by Gyan C. A. Fernando,
 ASTRA Passenger Coaches

Named passenger trains of Sri Lanka